Thomas Ronald "Tobler" Brownlees (20 October 1891 - 15 November 1954) was an Australian rules footballer who played with Geelong in the Victorian Football League (VFL).

Brownlees kicked 42 goals in his debut season, finishing second in the Geelong goal-kicking to Percy Martini. Despite managing a more modest total of 25 goals in 1915, it was enough to finish as their leading goal-kicker. Also used as a fullback, Brownlees represented the VFL at the 1921 Perth Carnival.

An elder brother, Rupe, also played over 100 games for Geelong.

References

External links
 
 

1891 births
1954 deaths
Geelong Football Club players
Australian rules footballers from South Australia